Eresiomera rougeoti is a butterfly in the family Lycaenidae. It is found in Cameroon, Bioko, Gabon, the Republic of the Congo, Uganda and north-western Tanzania.

References

Butterflies described in 1961
Poritiinae